Dyckia consimilis is a plant species in the genus Dyckia. This species is native to Brazil.

References

consimilis
Flora of Brazil